Mangatangi is a locality about 7 km east of Mangatawhiri and 10.5 km west of Miranda in the Waikato District in the North Island of New Zealand. 

Mangatangi is in meshblocks 0841200 (NW), 0841300 (NE) and 0932801 (S), which had a combined population of 441 people in the 2018 New Zealand census.

Mangatangi Reservoir in the Hunua Ranges to the north was created by the Mangatangi Dam, a rolled earth water supply dam built in the 1970s. The Mangatangi River flows south from the reservoir to become the Maramarua River.

The New Zealand Ministry for Culture and Heritage gives a translation of "Stream of Weeping" for Mangatangi.

The Mangatangi Hall on Kaiaua Road was opened in 1940 and extended in 1960. It contains the Mangatangi-Miranda roll of honour for local people who fought in the Second World War.

Demographics

Mangatangi had a population of 1,083 at the 2018 New Zealand census, an increase of 153 people (16.5%) since the 2013 census, and an increase of 225 people (26.2%) since the 2006 census. There were 339 households, comprising 585 males and 498 females, giving a sex ratio of 1.17 males per female. The median age was 34.3 years (compared with 37.4 years nationally), with 279 people (25.8%) aged under 15 years, 207 (19.1%) aged 15 to 29, 495 (45.7%) aged 30 to 64, and 108 (10.0%) aged 65 or older.

Ethnicities were 80.9% European/Pākehā, 18.3% Māori, 7.5% Pacific peoples, 3.6% Asian, and 2.8% other ethnicities. People may identify with more than one ethnicity.

The percentage of people born overseas was 16.3, compared with 27.1% nationally.

Although some people chose not to answer the census's question about religious affiliation, 59.6% had no religion, 32.1% were Christian, 0.6% had Māori religious beliefs, 0.8% were Hindu and 1.1% had other religions.

Of those at least 15 years old, 120 (14.9%) people had a bachelor's or higher degree, and 141 (17.5%) people had no formal qualifications. The median income was $39,800, compared with $31,800 nationally. 156 people (19.4%) earned over $70,000 compared to 17.2% nationally. The employment status of those at least 15 was that 483 (60.1%) people were employed full-time, 114 (14.2%) were part-time, and 30 (3.7%) were unemployed.

Marae

The Mangatangi Marae and Marae Kirikiri meeting house is a traditional meeting ground of Ngāti Tamaoho and the Waikato Tainui hapū of Ngāi Tai and Ngāti Koheriki.

In October 2020, the Government committed $2,584,751 from the Provincial Growth Fund to upgrade the marae and 7 other Waikato Tainui marae, creating 40 jobs.

Education

References 

Waikato District
Populated places in Waikato